Miroslav Kostadinov (born 10 March 1976) is a Bulgarian singer and songwriter who represented Bulgaria in the Eurovision Song Contest 2010 with the song "Angel si ti".

Biography
Kostadinov was born in Dobrich, Bulgaria. He began playing the piano as a child. Years later, he joined an amateur singing group. After receiving awards from a number of festivals, he collaborated with some friends who were well-known musicians. Kostadinov has won two awards in Varna Discovery, and has also performed in Turkey and Kazakhstan. Later, he became part of the pop duo KariZma. In 2007, he recorded his first two songs as a solo musician, entitled "Ever Before" and "Lose Control", the latter being the first single on his debut solo record Omirotvoren.

Eurovision Song Contest 2010
For the Eurovision Song Contest in 2010, Bulgaria decided not to use the multi-heat selection system of previous years and select their artist internally. A panel of 51 music experts voted for a number of candidates; Kostadinov was the winner with ten votes, followed by Poli Genova with seven, and Nora in third place with three. Other artists in the running were Slavi Trifonov, Maria Ilieva, Lili Ivanova, Elitsa Todorova and Stoyan Yankoulov, the 2007 Bulgarian representatives.

At a national final, Kostadinov performed five songs written especially for him, in five different music genres ranging from ethno to rock. The winning song, selected by televote, was "Angel si ti". It was performed in the second semi-final on 27 May 2010, but did not progress to the final.

Discography

Singles

Videography

KariZma
Рискувам да те имам (Riskuvam da te imam)
Колко ми липсваш (Kolko mi lipsvash)
Ще избягам ли от теб? (Shte izbiagam li ot teb?)
Mr.Killer
Минаваш през мен (Minavash prez men)
All in Love (Ne sega)

Solo career
Някога преди (Niakoga predi)
Завинаги (Zavinagi) feat. Anelia
Nirvana feat. Mike Johnson (2-4 family)
Губя контрол, когато (Gubia kontrol, kogato REMIX)
В едно огледало (V edno ogledalo) feat. Krum
Август е септември (Avgust e septemvri)
Убиваме с любов (Ubivame s lubov)
Ангел си ти (Angel si ti)
Mil Amantes feat. Feminnem and Sir Jam
POWER

Personal life
Kostadinov married Elitza Zlatanova in 2016.

Awards
2007 – Most Elegant Male
2008 – Fan TV award for Best Male Artist
2008 – Planeta TV award for Best Song ("Zavinagi" feat. Anelia)
2008 – Planeta TV award for Best Video ("Zavinagi" feat. Anelia)
2008 – BG Radio Music Awards – Best Lyrics ("Niakoga predi")
2008 – BG Radio Music Awards – Best Video ("Niakoga predi")
2008 – Nov folk Music Awards – Best Duet ("Zavinagi")
2008 – Romantika Radio – Best Song ("Zavinagi")
2008 – "Sing with me" reality show – 1st place (with Divna)
2009 – BG Radio Music Awards – Best Male Artist
2009 – BG Radio Music Awards – Best Song ("Gubia kontrol, kogato")
2009 – BG Radio Music Awards – Best Album ("Omirotvoren")
2009 – Mad Video Music Awards – Best Bulgarian Video ("Gubia kontrol, kogato REMIX")
2010 – BG Radio Music Awards – Best Male Artist
2010 – BG Radio Music Awards – Best Song ("Ubivame s lubov")
2010 – BG Radio Music Awards – Best Video ("Ubivame s lubov")

References

External links

 The official site of Miroslav Kostadinov

1976 births
Living people
Eurovision Song Contest entrants for Bulgaria
21st-century Bulgarian male singers
Bulgarian pop singers
Bulgarian singer-songwriters
Eurovision Song Contest entrants of 2010
People from Dobrich